Christoffer Bengtsberg (born 1 November 1989) is a Swedish professional ice hockey goaltender. He is currently playing with Lillehammer IK of the Norwegian GET-ligaen.

Bengtsberg made his Elitserien debut playing with HV71 during the 2008–09 Elitserien season.

After finishing the 2014–15 season with Södertälje SK in the HockeyAllsvenskan, Bengtsberg opted to pursue a North American career, signing a one-year ECHL contract with the Evansville IceMen on 6 August 2015.

References

External links

1989 births
Living people
Brynäs IF players
Evansville IceMen players
HV71 players
Mora IK players
Södertälje SK players
Swedish ice hockey goaltenders
Växjö Lakers players
Ice hockey people from Stockholm